Matias Montinho (born 15 July 1990) is an Angolan sailor. At the 2016 Summer Olympics he competed in the Men's 470 with Paixão Afonso. They finished in 26th place. He qualified to represent Angola at the 2020 Summer Olympics in the men's 470 with Paixão Afonso again.

References

External links
 
 
 

1990 births
Living people
Olympic sailors of Angola
Sailors at the 2016 Summer Olympics – 470
African Games bronze medalists for Angola
African Games medalists in sailing
Competitors at the 2011 All-Africa Games
Angolan male sailors (sport)
Sailors at the 2020 Summer Olympics – 470